A Cabinet of Curiosities is a 1619 oil on panel painting of a cabinet of curiosities by the Flemish painter Frans Francken II. It is now in the Royal Museum of Fine Arts, Antwerp, which bought it in 1903 from the Antwerp-based art dealer Joseph Hallyn.

Bibliography 
  America Bruid van de zon. Gent : Imschoot, 1991.
  Balis, Arnout et al. Das Flämische Stilleben 1550 – 1680. Lingen: Luca, 2002.
  Chong, Alan et al. Het Nederlandse Stilleven 1550 – 1720. Zwolle : Waanders, 1999.
  De Baere, Bart et al., red. Beelddenken: vijf eeuwen beeld in Antwerpen. Schoten : BAI, 2011.
  De Bie, Cornelis. Het gulden cabinet vande edel vry schilder const: inhoudende den lof vande vermarste schilders, architecten, beldthouwers ende plaetsnyders, van dese eeuw. Antwerpen : gedruckt by Jan Meyssens [Meyssens, Joannes], 1661.
  Härting, Ursula. Studien zur Kabinetbildmalerei des Frans Francken II, 1581 – 1642. Hildesheim: Olms, 1983.
 In the presence of things: four centuries of European still-life painting. Lisbon : Calouste Gulbenkian Foundation, 2010.
  Koninklijk Muzeum van Schoone Kunsten te Antwerpen, Beschrijvende Catalogus I Oude Meesters 1905. Antwerpen: Boek- en Steendrukkerij Jan Boucherij, 1905.
  Schrijvers, Nanny. In De tulp. Een wandelparcours door de tuinen en musea van Antwerpen, red. Sofie De Ruysser; Iris Kockelbergh en Myriam Wagemans. Antwerpen : Stadsbestuur, 2006.
  Speth – Holterhoff, S. Les peintres flamands de cabinet d’amateurs au 17e siècle. Bruxelles : Elsevier, 1957.
  Van der Schueren, Katrien. “De kunstkamers van Frans II Francken: kritsche analyse van de aldaar aanwezige sculptuur.” In Jaarboek Koninklijk Museum voor Schone Kunsten Antwerpen 1996.
  Van Hout, Nico. Bezoekersgids Het Gulden Cabinet. Koninklijk Museum bij Rockox te gast, 2013, p. 55.
  Van Hout, Nico. Bezoekersgids Het Gulden Cabinet. Koninklijk Museum bij Rockox te gast. The Sky is the Limit. Het landschap in de Nederlanden, 2017, p. 84.

References
 

Flemish paintings
Paintings in the collection of the Royal Museum of Fine Arts Antwerp
1619 paintings